John D. Cherry Jr. (born May 5, 1951) is an American politician who served as the 62nd lieutenant governor of Michigan from 2003 to 2011. A Democrat, Cherry also served as a gubernatorial appointee to the Midwestern Higher Education Compact, and was the immediate past chair of the international Great Lakes Commission (of which he is still a member).

Cherry was an announced candidate for Governor of Michigan in 2010. However, on January 5, he announced his withdrawal from the race, citing an inability to "secure enough money to make my candidacy fully viable."

Early life and education 
Cherry grew up in Montrose, Michigan and graduated from Hill-McCloy High School 1969. Cherry earned a Bachelor of Arts degree in political science from the University of Michigan in 1973 and a Master of Public Administration from the University of Michigan–Flint in 1984. He is of Polish and Scots-Irish descent.

Career 
A former staff member to Michigan State Senator Gary Corbin, Cherry served as the state political director for the American Federation of State, County, and Municipal Employees, until 1982. He was then elected to the Michigan Legislature as a State Representative (1983–1986), State Senator (1987–2002) and Senate Minority Leader.

Cherry was elected in 2002 as the running mate of Democrat Jennifer Granholm, passing on his state senate seat to his sister Deborah Cherry. As the lieutenant governor, John Cherry presided over the State Senate, casting votes there in the event of a tie.

As lieutenant governor, John Cherry was elected chairman of the National Lieutenant Governors Association (NLGA) in July 2006. John Cherry also chaired the Lt. Governor’s Commission on Higher Education & Economic Growth, with the commission making recommendations on higher education and the need to expand Michigan's job base. The Cherry Commission report led to the Michigan Promise scholarship, the No Worker Left Behind program, and Michigan replacing the high school MEAP exam with the ACT. Michigan also increased standards in the K-12 curriculum and graduation requirements consistent with the Commission's recommendations.

Cherry has been awarded Honorary Doctor of Laws degree from Saginaw Valley State University and an Honorary Doctor of Public Service degree from Central Michigan University. He has earned several awards including being recognized as "one of Michigan’s Most Effective Legislators" by The Detroit News and the 2005 Conservationist of the Year by the Michigan United Conservation Clubs.Cherry serves as the Chairman of the St. Andrew's Society of Detroit's Board of Trustees 2016 to present. Cherry serves as the Vice-President of the Council of Scottish Clans and Associations 2016 to present, and as President of the Clan MacLachlan Association of North America 2014 to present.

Personal life 
Cherry is married to former State Representative Pam Faris. They have two adult children, Meghan and John Daniel, and 4 grandchildren.

References

External links 
 John Cherry official campaign website: A Democrat for Governor
 Profile and posts on Michigan Liberal, a political blog
 The Political Graveyard

1951 births
Lieutenant Governors of Michigan
Living people
Democratic Party members of the Michigan House of Representatives
Democratic Party Michigan state senators
University of Michigan–Flint alumni
University of Michigan College of Literature, Science, and the Arts alumni
American politicians of Polish descent
People from Sulphur Springs, Texas
2000 United States presidential electors
People from Clio, Michigan
People from Genesee County, Michigan
American Federation of State, County and Municipal Employees people
20th-century American politicians
21st-century American politicians